Anna Elisabeth Frederika Lehmann (1876-1956) was a Dutch artist.

Biography 
Lehmann was born on 31 July 1876 in Delft. She studied at the Akademie van beeldende kunsten (Den Haag) (Royal Academy of Art, The Hague). She was taught by Johannes Josephus Aarts, Bernard Schluit, and Cornelis Koppenol. Lehmann married Koppenol.

Lehmann's work was included in the 1939 exhibition and sale Onze Kunst van Heden (Our Art of Today) at the Rijksmuseum in Amsterdam.

Klaassen died on 23 March 1956 in The Hague.

References

External links 
images of Lehmann's work on ArtNet

1876 births
1956 deaths
Artists from Delft
20th-century Dutch women artists